The 1990 Cork Junior A Hurling Championship was the 93rd staging of the Cork Junior A Hurling Championship since its establishment by the Cork County Board. The draw for the opening fixtures took place on 17 December 1989. The championship began on 7 October 1990 and ended on 18 November 1990.

The final was played on 18 November 1990 at Páirc Uí Chaoimh in Cork between Midleton and Ballincollig, in what was their first ever meeting in the final. Midleton won the match by 1-15 to 1-09 to claim their fourth championship title overall and a first title in six years.

Midleton's Kevin McCarthy was the championship's top scorer with 1-20.

Qualification

Results

Quarter-finals

 Meelin received a bye in this round.

Semi-finals

Final

Championship statistics

Top scorers

Overall

In a single game

References

1990 in hurling
Cork Junior Hurling Championship